The 1st constituency of Paris (French: Première circonscription de Paris) is a French legislative constituency in the department of Paris. Like the other 576 French constituencies, it elects one member of the National Assembly using the two-round system. Its boundaries were heavily redrawn in 1988 and 2012. In the 2017 legislative election, Sylvain Maillard of La République En Marche! (LREM) won a majority of the vote in the first round.

Deputies

Election results

2022

 
 
 
 
 
 
 
 

|-
| colspan="8" bgcolor="#E9E9E9"|
|-

2017

2012

 
 
 
 
 
 
 
|-
| colspan="8" bgcolor="#E9E9E9"|
|-

2007

Elections between 1988 and 2007 were based on the 1988 boundaries.

2002

 
 
 
 
 
 
|-
| colspan="8" bgcolor="#E9E9E9"|
|-

1997

 
 
 
 
 
 
 
|-
| colspan="8" bgcolor="#E9E9E9"|
|-

References

Government of Paris
1